The First Katsura Cabinet is the 11th Cabinet of Japan led by Katsura Tarō from June 2, 1901, to January 7, 1906.

Cabinet

References 

Cabinet of Japan
1901 establishments in Japan
Cabinets established in 1901